Dean Smith (born 25 January 1990) is an actor and comedian from Leeds, England. Dean is best known for playing Philip Ryan in the BBC 1 Drama Waterloo Road. Smith also played Vinnie Dupe, the geek without chic, in STV's comedy Being Victor, and William, in BBC1's Last Tango in Halifax. Most recently Dean revisited the role of Philip Ryan in the BBC online Drama Waterloo Road Reunited. This series followed 7 ex-pupils on life after Waterloo Road.

In 2019, Dean Smith took on the role of DS Yates in Hollyoaks, becoming a corrupt copper on local gangster Liam Donovans payroll. Also in 2019 he starred as Willis in the BBC 1 comedy Still Open All Hours.

Dean also takes part in various charity events including charity football matches.

In 2011, Dean and fellow Waterloo Road cast members Jack McMullen, Ben-Ryan Davies, Will Ash and actor Tom Gibbons took on the National Three Peaks Challenge.

Dean is patron of 'Once Upon a Smile' charity and takes part in many of their charity football matches.

Dean completed the Great Yorkshire Run in 2011 running for Cancer Research UK.

Filmography

References

External links
 
 

1990 births
English male television actors
Living people
Male actors from Leeds